Open Joint Stock Company Zaporizhzhia Shipbuilding-ShipRepair Plant is a civil shipbuilding company that carries out the repair of vessels and ships to the needs of river and sea fleet, located in Zaporizhzhia (Ukraine).
The branch of a joint-stock shipping company "Ukrrichflot." The factory has a developed shipbuilding base, including technology, equipment, specialists, that allows to repair and build ships and river vessels of mixed type of swimming "river-sea", passenger boats and other marine equipment.

The legal address of the company: 69055, Ukraine, Zaporizhzhia, Glisserna street, 14.

Production capacity
special wheel to lift vessels weighing up to 800 tons, length to 90 m, width to 16 m;
floating dock for lifting vessels weighing up to 5,000 tons, a length to 135 m, a width to 20 m;
lift vessels weighing up to 327 tons;
floating workshop

Main products
 Civil shipbuilding
 Vessels of type "Sea- Sea"
 Construction and repair of ships of type "the sea - the sea"
 Cargo ships
 Vehicles for transportation lamps
 Ships containers
 Universal cargo ships
 Tankers
 Sea Tankers
 Auxiliary vessels
 Icebreakers
 Ship repair and specialized work
 Capital, average, current, emergency repairs, accommodation in ports and modernization of vessels weighing up to 5,000 tons, passenger boats and other vessels of technical and passenger fleets.
 all types of repair of river ships and vessels of mixed type "sea -sea" and ship equipment
 repair of ship systems and devices
 overhaul of diesel engines (fuel equipment, adjustment and repair nozzles)
 electrical work, repair and manufacturing of switchgear, making jobs with current and 
average repair of ship electrical equipment.

Shipbuilding
In 2008, in Zaporizhzhia joint stock shipping company "Ukrrichflot" has completed production of series of five self-propelled barges of the type "Europe-M". Non-propelled barges of the type "Europa-M", were designed by office "Ukrrichflot" in 2004 and they are modern vehicles, which have a number of competitive advantages over most barges of fleets that were operated on the Danube. The length of the vessel is 76 meters, width - 11.4 m, capacity - 2080 tons.

References

Shipbuilding companies of Ukraine